The Nuisance is a 1921 American silent comedy film featuring Oliver Hardy.

Cast
 Jimmy Aubrey as The nuisance
 Rosa Gore as A widow
 Leila McCarthy as Her daughter
 Oliver Hardy as The walrus (as Babe Hardy)
 Jack Lloyd as City slicker
 George Fox as City slicker

See also
 List of American films of 1921
 Oliver Hardy filmography

External links

1921 films
1921 comedy films
1921 short films
American silent short films
American black-and-white films
Films directed by Jess Robbins
Silent American comedy films
American comedy short films
1920s American films